Janus is a fictional character appearing in American comic books published by Marvel Comics.

Fictional character biography
The Golden Angel was a possessing spirit who claimed to be an angel, a messenger and warrior of God. This angel was revealed to have appeared to Dracula and thwarted his will in the past. As an angel, he battled Dracula and predicted his death, although he was then slain by Dracula.

Dracula and his wife Domini later conceived through mystical means via a spell of Anton Lupeski. An infant was born to them in Boston, Massachusetts, and they named this baby Janus. Dracula sired this child as part of a plan to use the Church of Satan to fulfill his plans for world domination. The baby was accidentally shot and killed by Lupeski during an attack by Quincy Harker, Rachel van Helsing, Frank Drake, and Harold H. Harold on Dracula. Domini resurrected Janus by merging him with the same seeming Golden Angel Dracula had encountered years earlier, returning Janus to life as an adult. Janus became Dracula's opponent however, and battled Dracula to prevent his victims from becoming vampires. Alongside Dracula, Frank Drake, and Topaz, Janus also battled a demonic creature. During the "Star Waaugh" incident, Janus teamed with Lectronn and Crimebuster (Moore) to deal with mystical debris related to the incident.

When Quincy Harker had temporarily destroyed Dracula, the possessing Golden Angel abandoned Janus' body.  Janus immediately returned to Domini in human form, as a living baby.

Years later, Janus was kidnapped at the order of the vampire lord Varnae.

During the "Curse of the Mutants" storyline, Janus is betrayed by the Claw Sect and handed over to his brother Xarus (who has usurped his father Dracula's title of Lord of the Vampires). The Siren Sect leader Alyssa secretly hands him a light-deflecting pendant when he escapes.

Powers and abilities
As an angel sent by the forces of Heaven to Earth, Janus possessed superhuman strength, weather-controlling powers and immunity to Dracula's vampiric hypnotic powers, as well as being able to break his hypnotic hold over others. Janus could fire beams of concussive force from his eyes and to absorb and repel energies hurled against him, radiate blinding light, place people in temporal stasis, teleport himself and others at least thousands of miles across the face of the Earth, create illusory images, and transform into a golden eagle, retaining wings in humanoid form if desired. Janus could cause Dracula pain with a mere glance; he appeared able to survive physical death in astral form before incarnating in a new body. What special attributes the infant Janus might possess as a result of his vampire parentage remain unrevealed.

References

External links
 Janus at Marvel Wiki

Fictional characters from Boston
Marvel Comics characters with superhuman strength